Thomas Foods International is an Australian family-owned company based in South Australia. It is one of the largest meat processors in the country, and also has vegetable processing and distribution. The chief executive officer is Darren Thomas.

The company is vertically-integrated from a cattle feedlot near Tintinara through processing, chilling or freezing, distribution and sales of meat, seafood and vegetables.

History
The company was founded as T and R Pastoral by Chris Thomas and Bob Rowe in 1988. The company originally bought livestock and contracted out for meat processing. It bought the Murray Bridge abattoir in 1999 with 230 employees. It bought the Lobethal abattoir in 2003. In 2006, it also bought an abattoir in Western Australia and a defunct one in Port Pirie at which time it was the sixth-largest meat processor in Australia.

The Thomas family took outright ownership in 2008. The company was renamed to Thomas Foods International in 2013. At that time, it was Australia's third-largest red meat processor and largest family-owned processor. It processed 5000 cattle and 120,000 lambs per week at four sites, including one at Wallangarra.

In 2012, Thomas Foods International took up a 50% share in Holco meat storage and distribution. It was Australia's largest exporter of lamb and mutton, to over 80 countries.

The company added one of Australia's largest potato processors, Mondello Farms in 2013. That business was renamed to Thomas Foods International Fresh Produce in 2014. In 2020, the potato processing business was sold to a competitor, Mitolo Family Farms.

A fire at the Murray Bridge abattoir in January 2018 destroyed the meat processing line. Over the following months, production was increased at Lobethal in the Adelaide Hills and at Tamworth in New South Wales, but production was not restarted at closed facilities in Port Pirie or Wallangarra. In June 2019, Thomas Foods International announced that rather than rebuilding at the existing site in Murray Bridge, it would build a replacement on a new site eight kilometres away.

Construction of the new facility at Murray Bridge began in December 2020.

References

Family-owned companies of Australia
Food manufacturers of Australia
Companies based in South Australia